GroovyLab, formerly jLab, is a numerical computational environment implemented in Java. The main scripting engine of jLab is GroovySci, an extension of Groovy. Additionally, the interpreted J-Scripts (similar to MATLAB) and dynamic linking to Java class code are supported.

The jLab environment aims to provide a MATLAB/Scilab like scientific computing platform that is supported
by scripting engines implemented in the Java language.

In the current implementation of jLab there coexist two scripting engines:
 the interpreted j-Script scripting engine and
 the compiled Groovy scripting engine. The later (i.e. Groovy) seems to be the preferred  choice, since it is much faster, can execute directly Java code using only the familiar Java packaging rules, and is feature-rich language, i.e. Groovy enhanced with MATLAB style matrix operations and surrounding support environment.

See also 
 List of numerical-analysis software
 Comparison of numerical-analysis software

External links 
 https://github.com/sterglee/GroovyLab
 https://sourceforge.net/projects/groovylab/
 https://code.google.com/archive/p/jlabgroovy/

Numerical programming languages
Free mathematics software
Array programming languages